AREC may refer to:

 Amateur Radio Emergency Communications service in New Zealand
 American Railway Express Company Garage in Philadelphia, Pennsylvania, U.S.
 Avalanche Recordings catalogue numbers
 American Resources Corporation in Fishers, Indiana, U.S.
 Agricultural Research and Education Center of the American University of Beirut
 Affiliated Renewable Energy Center of:
University of Eastern Philippines
Central Philippine University
 Associacao dos Ressortissants do Enclave de Cabinda, a Cabinda War organisation
 American River Electric Company power house in Swansboro, California
 AREC, type of Field hockey stick
 Agency for Real Estate Cadastre, national mapping agency of Macedonia